

List of managers
The complete list of PAOK managers is shown in the following table:

Notes
A.   Formerly played for the club

B.  Les Shannon is the longest-serving manager (3 years an 8 months).

C.  Angelos Anastasiadis is the overall longest serving manager (4 years and 2 months), in four distinct terms. Also has the most games in four distinct terms (211).

D.  Mario Beretta is the shortest-serving manager (38 days).

E.  On 31 May 1981, while still working as coach (Gyula Lóránt), he suffered a heart attack, watching PAOK play Olympiacos and died at the game, aged 58.

F.  The 1st National Division (A’ Ethniki) was established in 1959-60. PAOK had the Žarko Mihajlović as head coach.

(c) = Caretaker manager

References

managers
PAOK